A list of Spanish-produced and co-produced feature films released in Spain in 1986.

Films

See also 
 1st Goya Awards

References

External links
 Spanish films of 1986 at the Internet Movie Database

1986
Spanish
Films